The spot-winged starling (Saroglossa spilopterus) is a species of starling in the family Sturnidae. It breeds in northern India and western Nepal; it winters in Northeast India, north-eastern Bangladesh and Myanmar. Its natural habitats are subtropical or tropical moist lowland forest and subtropical or tropical moist montane forest. This species was first bred in the UK by Mrs K.M. Scamell in 1969. A detailed account of the breeding can be found in the January/February 1970 edition of Foreign Birds, the journal of the Foreign Bird League.

References

External links
Image at ADW

spot-winged starling
Birds of India
Birds of Nepal
spot-winged starling
Taxonomy articles created by Polbot